Samuel Henry Robinson (26 July 1910–1995) was an English footballer who played for Bournemouth and Boscombe Athleticv, Clapton Orient, Luton Town  and Mansfield Town.

References

1910 births
1995 deaths
English footballers
Association football defenders
English Football League players
Luton Town F.C. players
AFC Bournemouth players
Derby County F.C. players
Mansfield Town F.C. players
Leyton Orient F.C. players
Guildford City F.C. players